Philip V may refer to:

 Philip V of Macedon (221–179 BC)
 Philip V of France (1293–1322)
 Philip II of Spain, also Philip V, Duke of Burgundy (1526–1598)
 Philip V of Spain (1683–1746)